State Highway 79 runs in Erode, Namakkal  and Salem districts of Tamil Nadu, India. It connects Erode in the west with Malliakarai, Attur taluk in the east.

Route 
The highway passes through Pallipalayam, Tiruchengode and Rasipuram extending to a length of 98.8 km.

Major junctions 

 State Highway 96 (Tamil Nadu) at Erode
 State Highway 79A at Pallipalayam
 State Highway 94 at Tiruchengode
 National Highway NH-44 (Old NH-7) near Rasipuram

References

State highways in Tamil Nadu
Transport in Erode